Ghatak (pronounced: gʰɑːt̪ək) is an autonomous jet powered stealthy unmanned combat air vehicle (UCAV), being developed by Aeronautical Development Establishment (ADE) of the Defence Research and Development Organisation (DRDO) for the Indian Air Force. The design work on the UCAV is to be carried out by Aeronautical Development Agency (ADA). Autonomous Unmanned Research Aircraft (AURA) was a tentative name for the UCAV. Details of the project are classified.

The Ghatak UCAV will have internal weapons bay for carrying missiles, bombs and precision-guided munitions. Its design will be based on flying-wing concept, and will be powered by a turbofan engine.

The first flight of a scaled down testbed was carried out in July 2022, and that of a full scale prototype is expected in 2025.

Description
The Ghatak is an autonomous jet powered stealthy unmanned combat air vehicle (UCAV), being developed by the Aeronautical Development Establishment (ADE). It was initially called the Autonomous Unmanned Research Aircraft (AURA), but was eventually renamed as Ghatak UCAV. In 2015, Defence Minister Manohar Parrikar informed Rajya Sabha that Ghatak UCAV will be powered by a dry variant of Kaveri afterburning turbofan engine, which will have a thrust of 52 kilonewtons.

The flight control system and data link packages of the UCAV will be developed inhouse by ADA and Defence Electronics Application Laboratory. The Ghatak UCAV will be developed with public – private sector participation.

Development

Project Ghatak 
Project Ghatak was initiated as a successor to the 2009 AURA (Autonomous Unmanned Research Aircraft) programme. The AURA programme was completed in April 2013. The project Ghatak was initiated by ADA in consultation with the Indian Air Force (IAF), with an objective to develop a stealthy UCAV based on flying wing design. The flying wing configuration is inherently stealthy, can carry more fuel and payload than conventional UCAV designs, however it has more complex flight control surfaces and laws. Times Now news quoting DRDO scientists reports that this design ensures optimum fuel use and stability for the aircraft. The Ghatak UCAV is projected to weigh less than a fighter jet and is intended to be powered by a 'dry engine' derivative of GTRE GTX-35VS Kaveri turbofan engine capable of producing a thrust of 52 kN. According to a Press Information Bureau (PIB) document dated to 2017, an initial fund of  had been allocated in 2016 for the design of Ghatak and development of critical advanced Technologies for Ghatak & HAL AMCA. The Indian Navy is also interested in the project, and is keen on acquiring deck based UCAVs for future aircraft carriers and Landing Platform Docks (LPD).

Stealth Wing Flying Testbed (SWiFT)

Development of a scaled down technology demonstrator of Ghatak UCAV, called Stealth Wing Flying Testbed (SWiFT), began in 2020. According to DRDO, the SWiFT UAV is intended to develop and demonstrate technologies for controlling the flying wing configuration and flight characteristics at high-subsonic speed. The ground trials of SWiFT UAV began in June 2021, picture and videos of it carrying out taxi trials surfaced on 29 October 2021. It had resemblance to the US Northrop Grumman B-2 Spirit stealth bomber. The SWiFT UAV has a length of 4 metres and a wingspan of 5 metres. The weigh of Swift UAV is around 1 tonne, and it uses a NPO Saturn 36MT or TRDD-50MT turbofan engine.

The SWiFT UAV (technology demonstrator of Ghatak UCAV) took its maiden flight on 1 July 2022. According to DRDO, the aircraft exhibited a perfect flight, including take-off, way-point navigation and a smooth touchdown while operating in a fully autonomous mode. However, the aircraft flown in the video uses a vertical stabilizer which is otherwise absent from the design. This is possibly due to issues with the horizontal stability of the aircraft.

The airframe, undercarriage and entire flight control and avionics systems used for the aircraft (SWiFT UAV) were developed indigenously. Apart from being a precursor for technology development related to Ghatak project, SWiFT might also move ahead as separate project under unmanned wingman bomber program.

See also

 Unmanned combat aerial vehicle
Related development
 DRDO Rustom
Aircraft of comparable role, configuration and era
 Sukhoi S-70 Okhotnik
 Boeing X-45
 Northrop Grumman X-47
 Lockheed Martin Polecat
 Dassault nEUROn
 BAE Taranis
 Boeing Phantom Ray
 Mikoyan Skat

Notes

References

External links
 Stealth UCAV AURA

Technical:
 Engine Layout and Modules of Manik STFE

Stealth aircraft
Proposed aircraft of India
Proposed military aircraft
Unmanned military aircraft of India
AURA
Unmanned stealth aircraft